Michael Joseph Stefanski (born September 12, 1969) is a former catcher in minor league baseball, and most recently the catching coordinator for the Cincinnati Reds.

Playing career
Stefanski was selected by the Milwaukee Brewers in the 40th round of the 1991 Free-Agent Draft. He played his entire career in the minor leagues, where he played for multiple teams. He received numerous accolades, including a trip to the  Texas League All-Star Game, and was California League Batter of the Week in May 1993. He was also won the  Arizona League batting title with a batting average of .364. Stefanski played in the farm systems of the Reds, Brewers and St. Louis Cardinals. He appeared in 786 games as a catcher, and even pitched four games in relief, compiling a 5.40 earned run average.

On January 27,  he retired as a player and joined the Reds staff as the bullpen catcher.

On December 4, 2013, he was promoted to the Reds' catching coordinator.

Personal
Stefanski graduated from Redford Union High School in Redford, Michigan, in 1987, where he excelled in baseball and basketball. He attended the University of Detroit, where Stefanski was twice named All-Conference in baseball.

References

Baseball Reference (minors)

1969 births
Living people
Arizona League Brewers players
Arkansas Travelers players
Baseball catchers
Baseball players from California
Baseball players from Flint, Michigan
Beloit Brewers players
Cincinnati Reds coaches
El Paso Diablos players
Louisville Bats players
Louisville Redbirds players
Major League Baseball bullpen catchers
Memphis Redbirds players
New Orleans Zephyrs players
Stockton Ports players
Detroit Mercy Titans baseball players